Rachida Mahamane (born 25 August 1981) is a Nigerien long-distance runner. She competed in the women's 5000 metres at the 1996 Summer Olympics. She was the first woman to represent Niger at the Olympics.

References

External links
 

1981 births
Living people
Athletes (track and field) at the 1996 Summer Olympics
Nigerien female long-distance runners
Olympic athletes of Niger
Place of birth missing (living people)